Switzerland has an extensive network of  metre gauge railways, many of which interchange traffic (most prominent is the Rhaetian Railway).  They are concentrated in the more heavily mountainous areas. The Jungfrau terminates at the highest station in Europe. Dual gauge (combined metre- and standard gauge trackway) also exists in many areas. Also, nearly all street tramways in Switzerland have always been meter gauge.

Gauge Changing Trains 
Since December 2022, / gauge changing trains have started operating between Lake Geneve and Interlaken  Zweisimmen is the location of the gauge change. While the carriage gauge is change, the locomotive do not change gauge and the locomotives have to be replaced.

See also 
 Rail transport in Switzerland

References 

Rail infrastructure in Switzerland
Switzerland